Giovanna's Father is a 2008 Italian drama film directed by  Pupi Avati.

Plot 
In Bologna in the late 1930s, Michele Casali (Silvio Orlando) teaches design at the same institute where his daughter Giovanna (Alba Rohrwacher) studies. Michele is a loving father, but overprotective. He does not recognize the mental health problems of his daughter and cannot save her when she is committed to a mental institution after killing her best friend.

Cast 
Silvio Orlando: Michele Casali 
Francesca Neri: Delia Casali 
Alba Rohrwacher: Giovanna Casali 
Ezio Greggio: Sergio Ghia 
Serena Grandi: Lella Ghia 
Manuela Morabito: Elide Traxler 
Gianfranco Jannuzzo: Preside Apolloni 
Paolo Graziosi: Andrea Taxler 
Valeria Bilello: Marcella Taxler

External links 
 

2008 films
2000s Italian-language films
2008 drama films
Films directed by Pupi Avati
Films set in Italy
Films set in Emilia-Romagna
Italian drama films
2000s Italian films